The Lemos Theatrical Company was a theatrical company formed in 1944.  It is named after the actor Adamantios Lemos.

The founding of Thiasos Lemos

On June 14, 1944, Adamantios Lemos and Mary Giatra Lemou founded the Lemos Theatrical Company.  Lemos was still with the armed forces in the Middle East when he was in exile and was unable to have a theatrical company that has his own name, the theatrical company was actually known as Mairi Lemou Company. (In June 1944, Maria Giatra Lemou resigned from the Armed Forces Recreational Council and ran as a main company in which Adamantios Lemos acted and directed 23 works.

The beginning of the presentation on June 14, in the Amusement Park summer theater in Alexandria and several times in the cities of Cairo (at Esvekia and Lycée Français), Masura, Zayazik, Kafr el-Zayat, Suez, Port Said which was planned in the Metropolitan winter theatre and at Moasat in Alexandria:

23 works that were played in 302 performances were:

Ladislas Fodor
Charles Marais
The Falcon by Francis de Croizier
Seat 47 by Louis Bernouilles
Georges Tourner
Pierre Wolf
Paul Geraldi
Émile Zole
Erotic Adventures by de Fler and Cavialler
Dario Nikodemi
Arnold and Bach
Brue
Anna Christie by Eugene O'Neill
Anton Chekhov
And in Greek:
Ta arravoniasmata (Τ' αρραβωνιάσματα) and Bourini (Μπουρίνι) by Dimitris Bogris
To Fidanaki (Το Φιντανάκι) by Pantelis Horn and Dimitris Bogri
That's What I Am (Αυτός είμαι = Aftos ime) by Th. Sinodinou
O Pirasmos (Ο Πειρασμός) by Grigorios Xenopoulos
Na zi to Mesolongi (Να ζει το Μεσολόγγι = Long Live Messolongi) by Vassilis Rotas

Actors at Mairi Lemou Theatrical Company

Mairi Giatra Lemou
Adamantios Lemos
Giorgos Politis
Kostas Magis
Alekos Kalogiannis
Yiannis Nikolaidis
Kiki Persi
Labis Mashalidis
Fofo Paschalidou
Kostas Kostantiou
M. Cernovic (Sternos)
Keti Voutsaki
Giorgos Iordanidis
Mary Karmina
Rita Thersi, Stavros Dinou
Em. Emmanouil
D. Stavridakis
    
From January until August 1945, the Mary Lemou Theatrical Company practiced acts in Egyptian cities including Mansura, Zayazik, Tada, Port Said, Suex, Karfer Zayat and returned to Alexandria where it gave its last farewell presentations at the Metropolitan Theatre on Wednesday, August 8, 1945.

Adamantios Lemos returned to Greece from Egypt in the summer of 1947 and made the Lemos Theatrical Company and began the presentations at the Palladio Theatre in Kallithea with the scope of discovery and searchlight on new postwar theatrical strengths.

Later at the Palladio with planned luck, Lemos indicated a property north of the central Thisseos Avenue in Kallithea in which the person that showed the conversion in which some of his works with his equipment with Lemos' costs.  The symphony did the extinguishing in which many became works and were around 20% above in uncleaned receipts.  Lemos put his economy which he took and a paid amount from the Working Fund.

May–September 1949 (summer period) - The theatrical company for the second time at Dionyssia Theatre in Kallithea.  He began with the first presented work of Sotiris Patatzis and presented in several first presented works:

Konta sto Theo (Κοντά στο Θεό = Closer to God) by Rois Varoussiadou
Enas apo emas (Ένας από εμάς = One From Us) by Gerassimos Stavros
To Fioro tou Levante (Το Φιόρο του Λεβάντε = Levante's Fioro) by Grigoris Xenopoulos
To klidi tis eftyhias (Το Κλειδί της Ευτυχίας = The Key of Luck) by Pavlina Petrovatou
To Meltemaki (Το Μελτεμάκι) by Pantelis Horn
Apagogi tis Smaragdos (Απαγωγή της Σμαράγδος) by Mihalis Kounelakis
Tatanik Vals by Th. Musatesko
Kiss Me by Tristan Bernard
Dario Nicodemi
Florence Barclay

The third year of Lemos Theatrical Company in Kallithea was one of the efficient and optimistic, the reason that was between the abundant manuscripts that were clearly seen from everywhere, from six of his works that were lately received by Lemos for his current summer period of 1949, it had several theatrical sources.  First was one from Sotiris Patatazis.  It was later named after the theatrical actor Adamantios Lemos.

May–September 1950 (Summer period): at the Dionyssia Theatre in Kallithea, Lemos continued to present Greek works by new writers, it even had the discovery of Iakovos Kambanellis with the work: Horos pano sta stahia.

Works included:

I Theatrini (Οι Θεατρίνοι) - Alekos Galanois, director: Karolos Coon:
To Makrino Tragoudi (Το Μακρινό Τραγούδι = A Long Song) by Manthos Ketsis
O Kir. Sofoklis politevete (Ο Κυρ. Σοφοκλής πολιτεύεται = Mr. Sofoklis Runs)
Idiorrithmi siziyi (Ιδιόρρυθμοι σύζυγοι) by Minas Petridis
Mayiki Ravdos (Μαγική Ράβδος) by G. Koundouris

Actors:
Adamantios Lemos
Maria Giatra Lemou
Maria Giatra Lemou
Maria Giannakopoulou
Nikos Efthymiou
Alexis Damianos
Stavros Xenidis
Eva Evangelidou
Eleni Stragala
Vikros Pavlatos
Maroula Rota
Rena Margari
Rika Galani
Julia Bouka
Dimitris Kalivokas
Artemis Matsas
Margarita Yeraldou
Kostas Dimitriou
Floros Stratos
Giorgos Kambanellis
Giorgos Koundouris
Giorgos Theodossiadis

In 1951, Lemos toured his theatrical company.  The absence of the first run informatical presentation of the theatrical company in Kallithea had made it to all of Greece by the Press and the radio.  Truly in the dramatology were included and the recent lucks of the theatricals with the first-presented writers:

Sotiris Patatzis
I Theatrini (Οι θεατρίνοι) and To party tou Polyniki (Το πάρτυ του Πολυνείκη = Polynice's? Party) by Alekos Galanos
Nyftiako tragoudi (Νυφιάτικο τραγούδι) by Notis Pergialis
Enas apo mas (Ένας από μας = One Of Us) by Gerassimos Stavros and ten other works by the repertory,

St. Hrysos in the newspaper Ellinikos Voras April 1, 1951 wrote: The Lemos Theatrical Company is the best which recently opened in Thessaloniki.  In "Nyftiako tragoudi", Lemos passed Veakis and functioned one strong Bali job, which not only touched otherwise he brings many practices and education that are used for the working of that role.

Visits of Lemos Theatrical Company in Egypt and Sudan

Between October 1952 and April 1953 (winter season in Egypt and Sudan), it started in Alexandria.  It premiered on October 24 at the Casablanca Theatre with the work of Tristan Bernard and included 12 works from the repertory.

Adamantios Lemos in "Piraean Council" in Piraeus

November 1953 – April 1954 (winter season): The theatrical company performed at Peraikou Sindesmou Theatre.  It began on November 18.  Its works included"

Maurice Brandel and Anita Hart
Eftheia ke Tethlasmeni (Ευθεία και Τεθλασμένη) by D. Psatha and G. Roussou
Otto Schwartz
O Giorgaras (Aftos Eimai) (Ο Γιωργάρας (Αυτός Είμαι)) by Th. Sinadinou
Ladislaus Fodos
T' Arravoniasmata (Τ’ Αρραβωνιάσματα) by D. Bogria
Mia kiria Atihisassa (Μια κυρία Ατυχήσασσα) by Sakellariou-Giannakopoulou
Apagori tis Smaragdos (Απαγωγή της Σμαράγδος) by M. Kounelaki
Dario Nicodemi
Charles DeVinois  A total of 15 works.

Actors and actresses:

Adamantios Lemos
Mary Giatra Lemou
Giorgos Loukakis
Spyros Konstantopoulos
G. Tsitsopoulos
Thanassis Kedrakas
Spyros Kalogirou
Tassos Politopoulos
Lambros Kotsiris
Spyros Papafrantzis
Th. Aronis
Hr. Anastasiadis
Kostas Korassidis
Chr. Nazos
G. Pappas
Ida Christinaki
Evi Pollu
Yiania Olymbiou
Sapfo Notara
Ekali Sokkou
Lola Filippidou
Lia Samiotaki
Katia Athanassiou
Chr. Karali
Ourania Ioannou

October 1954 – April 1955 (winter period) at Peiraikos Syndesmou Theatre

Nyftiako Tragoudi (Νυφιάτικο Τραγούδι) by N Pergiali
Tristan Bernard
O Babas Ekpedevete (Ο Μπαμπάς Εκπαιδεύεται) by Spyros Melas
De Fler and Callaver
Arnold and Bach
O Agapidikos tis Voskopoulas (Ο Αγαπητικός της Βοσκοπούλας) by D. Koromilas
I Kassiani by Dimitris Giannoukakis
Jean De Letrages
T'Arravoniasmata (Τ’ Αρραβωνιάσματα) by D. Bogris

Actors and actresses
Adamantios Lemos
Maria Giatra-Lemou
Kostas Rigopoulos
Sapfo Notara
Giorgos Loukakis
Nikos Efthymiou
Spyros Kostantopoulos
Nassos Kerdakas
Tassos Politopoulos
Spyros Kalogyrou
Efy Polly
Yianna Olymbiou
Ekali Sokou
Marika Anthopoulou
Lola Filippidou
Thodoris Triandafillidis
Ida Christinaki
Spyros Papafrantzis
Labros Kotsiris
Kostas Korassidis
Keti Chronopoulou
Christos Anastasiadis
Thanos Aronis
Lia Samiotaki
Ch. Nazos
Christina Karali
Mirka Raizi
K. Athanasiou
M. Athanasiou
Ourania Ioannou

October 1955 – April 1956 (winter period) at Peiraikou Syndesmou Theatre

I limni ton Dollarion ( λίμνη των Δολαρίων = Dollar Lake) by D. Tzefroni
Otto Schwartz
O Fataoulas (Ο Φαταούλας)
Charles Nevinois

May–September 1955 (summer period) presented the comedy actor, D. Koromilas O Agapitikos tis Voskopoulas in a folk style celebration with 8,000 people and was sold out at the ancient theater in Argos with the council of the Greek Folk Dance And Singing Company by Dora Stratou.

External links
https://web.archive.org/web/20101024060325/http://www.lemostheater.org/ 

Theatre companies in Greece
Organizations established in 1944
1944 establishments in Greece
Culture in Attica
Kallithea